Baratca may refer to several places in Romania:

 Barațca, a village in Păuliș Commune, Arad County
 Baratca, a village in Bârgăuani Commune, Neamț County